Groß Laasch is a municipality in the Ludwigslust-Parchim district, in Mecklenburg-Vorpommern, Germany.

Notable people
Adolf Hamann (1885–1945), German Nazi officer executed for war crimes
Horst Metz (1945–2022), politician

References

Ludwigslust-Parchim